The succession to the throne of the French Empire was vested by Bonapartist emperors in the descendants and selected male relatives of  Napoleon I. Following the abolition of the Second French Empire in 1870, Bonapartist pretenders descended from Napoleon I's brothers have maintained theoretical claims to the imperial office.

Origins of the French Empire 
The French Empire (or Napoleonic Empire) formally existed during two periods when the head of the French state was a monarch who held the title of Emperor of the French.

The First French Empire was the regime established by Napoleon I in France. This empire lasted from 1804 to 1814, from the Consulate of the First French Republic to the Bourbon Restoration, and was briefly restored during the Hundred Days in 1815.

The Second French Empire was the regime established in France by Napoleon III from 1852 to 1870, between the Second French Republic and the Third French Republic. Napoleon III was the third son of Louis Bonaparte, a younger brother of Napoleon I, and Hortense de Beauharnais, the daughter of Napoleon I's wife, Josephine de Beauharnais, by her first marriage.

Bonapartism had its followers from 1815 onward among those who never accepted the defeat at Waterloo or the Congress of Vienna. Napoleon I's death in exile on Saint Helena in 1821 only transferred the allegiance of many of his loyalists to other members of the House of Bonaparte.

After the death in 1832 of Napoleon I's son, known to Bonapartists as Napoleon II, Bonapartist hopes rested in several different members of the family.

The disturbances of 1848 gave this group hope. Bonapartists were essential in the election of Napoleon I's nephew Louis-Napoléon Bonaparte as president of the Second French Republic. They also gave him crucial political support for the 1852 coup d'état, which overthrew the Republic and paved the way for the proclamation of the Second French Empire the following year, with Napoleon III as emperor.

In 1870, Napoleon III led France to a disastrous defeat at the hands of Prussia in the Franco-Prussian War, and he subsequently abdicated.

Following the definite overthrow of the Second French Empire, the Third French Republic was established. Bonapartism faded from a civic faith and monarchist bloc to an obscure predilection, more akin to a hobby than a practical political philosophy or movement. The death knell for Bonapartism was probably sounded when Louis-Napoléon Bonaparte, the only son of Napoleon III, was killed in action while serving as a British Army officer in Zululand in 1879. Thereafter, Bonapartism ceased to be a political force.

First Napoleonic law of succession

The law of succession that Napoleon I established on becoming emperor in 1804 provided that the imperial throne should pass firstly to Napoleon I's own legitimate male descendants through the male line, to the perpetual exclusion of women.

It further provided that if Napoleon I's own direct line died out, the claim passed first to his older brother Joseph Bonaparte and to his legitimate male descendants through the male line, then to his younger brother Louis Bonaparte and his legitimate male descendants through the male line. His other brothers, Lucien Bonaparte and Jérôme Bonaparte, and their descendants, were omitted from the succession, even though Lucien was older than Louis, because they had politically defied the emperor, made marriages of which he disapproved, or both.

Upon the extinction of legitimate natural and adopted male, agnatic descendants of Napoleon I, and those of two of his brothers, Joseph and Louis, the throne was to be awarded to a man selected by the non-dynastic princely and ducal dignitaries of the empire, as ratified by a plebiscite.

At the time the law of succession was decreed, Napoleon I had no legitimate sons, and it seemed unlikely that he would have any due to the age of his wife, Joséphine de Beauharnais. His eventual response was to have his marriage to Joséphine annulled and to undertake a second marriage with Roman Catholic rites to Archduchess Marie Louise, daughter of Emperor Francis I of Austria. Their only child was Napoleon, King of Rome, known in exile as "Napoleon II" and as the Duke of Reichstadt. He died unmarried, thereby extinguishing the legitimate descent of Napoleon I.

Second Napoleonic law of succession

Meanwhile, Napoleon I's older brother, Joseph, recognized upon establishment of the First Empire as first in line to succeed and (after the birth of the King of Rome) as second in line, died on 28 July 1844 without ever having had a legitimate son. Although two of Joseph's daughters married in exile, when the Bonaparte dynasty was restored by the 1851 French coup d'état in France in December 1851, the man who soon became emperor as Napoleon III was the only living, legally legitimate son of Louis Bonaparte, former King of Holland.

In December 1852, with the imperial crown on his head, Napoleon III, still a bachelor, exercised the authority granted him by a decree in the form of a Sénatus-consulte (and confirmed by plebiscite), to enact a new organic law on the succession (in the event he himself were to leave no legitimate descendants). Napoleon III recognized Napoleon I's last surviving brother, Jérôme, as the heir presumptive. (During Napoleon I's reign, Jérôme had been one of the Bonaparte brothers who was bypassed in the order of succession, his first marriage having been an elopement with the American commoner Elizabeth Patterson over the emperor's objections. The Second Empire, however, empowered the new emperor to choose an heir among any of Napoleon I's nephews.) After Jérôme came Jérôme's male descendants by his second, dynastic marriage to Princess Catharine of Württemberg.

Napoleon III, hitherto a bachelor, began to look for a wife to produce a legitimate heir. Most of the royal families of Europe were unwilling to intermarry with the parvenu House of Bonaparte. After several rebuffs, including from Princess Carola of Sweden and Princess Adelaide von Hohenlohe-Langenburg, Napoleon III decided to lower his sights somewhat and marry for love instead, choosing the young, beautiful countess of Teba, Eugénie de Montijo, a Spanish noblewoman who had been brought up in Paris.

In 1856, Eugénie gave birth to a legitimate son and heir, Napoléon Eugène Louis, the Prince Imperial who, upon his father's defeat in battle and deposition in September 1870, went into exile. He became the claimant to the throne of the Second Empire when his father died in 1873. Like the King of Rome, the Prince Imperial died unwed and childless. All Bonapartist claimants since 1879 have been descendants of Jérôme Bonaparte in the male line.

List of Bonapartist claimants to the French throne
This branch of claimants was established by Napoleon Joseph Charles Bonaparte, nicknamed Plon-Plon. He was the only legitimate male descendant of Jérôme Bonaparte from his second marriage to Princess Catherine of Württemberg. He married Princess Clothilde of Savoy and died in 1891. His son, Victor, Prince Napoléon, the next claimant, wed Princess Clémentine of Belgium, and died in 1926.

He was succeeded by his son, Louis Jérôme Bonaparte, husband of Alix de Foresta, daughter of Count Albéric de Foresta, who died in 1997. He was succeeded by his son, Charles Marie Jérôme Victor Napoléon Bonaparte. He married, civilly, Princess Béatrice of Bourbon-Two Sicilies, from whom he was divorced, being subsequently declared excluded as Napoleonic heir in his father's will for divorcing her and remarrying a commoner without paternal permission. His heir apparent (recognized by some as head of the House of Bonaparte since 1997) is his son, Jean-Christophe Napoléon.

There are no surviving descendants in the legitimate male line of any of Napoleon's brothers except Jérôme. This branch of the House of Bonaparte is recognized by Bonapartists as Napoleon I's dynastic heirs, being excluded from residence in France or service in its military by law, along with the heads of the House of Orléans, between 1883 and 1950.

The head and dynastic members of the family bear the title of Prince with the name Napoléon (Bonaparte) and the style of Imperial Highness.

Line of succession in September 1870

 Carlo Buonaparte (1746–1785)
  Napoleon I (1769–1821)
  Napoleon II (1811–1832)
 Louis Bonaparte (1778–1846)
  Napoleon III (born 1808)
 (1) Napoléon, Prince Imperial (b. 1856)
 Jérôme Bonaparte (1784–1860)
 (2) Napoléon Joseph, Prince Français (b. 1822)
 (3) Napoléon Victor Jérôme Frédéric, Prince Français (b. 1862)
 (4) Napoléon Louis Joseph Jérôme, Prince Français (b. 1864)

See also 
 Legitimism 
 Orleanism
 Succession to the French throne

References 

French
 
French